Polyipnus spinosus, commonly known as the spiny hatchetfish, is a species of ray-finned fish in the family Sternoptychidae.

References

Sternoptychidae
Fish of Indonesia
Fish of the Philippines
Fish described in 1887
Taxa named by Albert Günther